Colorado Technical University (CTU) is a private for-profit university with its main campus in Colorado Springs, Colorado. The university is owned by Perdoceo Education Corporation. Founded in 1965, CTU offers undergraduate, graduate, and doctoral degrees, primarily in business, management, and technology. About 92% of Colorado Tech's students are fully online. According to Colorado Tech, the university has conferred more than 118,000 degrees worldwide.Colorado Tech has no public or official affiliation with the State of Colorado.

History
The school was established as Colorado Technical College in 1965, with a focus on training former military personnel in technical and vocational subjects. In 1995, the institution gained university status and changed its name to Colorado Technical University. In 2012, CTU began using a proprietary adaptive learning program called Intellipath, to provide personalized learning. In 2013 and 2014, Military Times magazine ranked CTU #1 Best for Vets in the category for online and non-traditional universities. It achieved this ranking again in 2016. The CTU campus in Sioux Falls, South Dakota closed in September 2016.

Lawsuits, investigations, and financial problems
Colorado Tech was under heightened cash monitoring by the US Department of Education to provide additional oversight of cash management.

On March 9, 2020, the Department of Veterans Affairs suspended G.I. Bill reimbursement eligibility for Colorado Technical University and several other for-profit schools due to what the V.A. said were "erroneous, deceptive, or misleading enrollment and advertising practices", giving the schools 60 days to take "corrective action". The VA withdrew its threat of sanctions in July 2020.

Funding
CTU receives approximately 95% of all funds from the US government, including about $3 million from the Department of Defense and $33 million from GI Bill funds.

Campuses
The university maintains Colorado campuses in Colorado Springs (main campus) and Aurora. Additionally, a number of its degree programs can be completed entirely or largely online.

Academics
Colorado Tech's President is Andrew H. Hurst, who was an executive at Education Management Corporation for 10 years.
Colorado Technical University offers accredited degree programs in business, engineering, and applied scientific disciplines, including Accounting, Business Administration, Computer Science, Criminal Justice, Engineering, Finance, Health Sciences, Information Systems and Technology, Management, and Public Administration.

Adaptive learning
Colorado Tech relies on a computerized adaptive learning program called Intellipath to deliver personalized instruction.

Faculty
Colorado Tech employs 52 full-time and 1095 part-time instructors.

Schools and colleges
CTU has the following areas of study: 
 
 College of Business & Management
 College of Engineering & Computer Science
 College of Health Sciences
 College of Information Systems & Technology
 College of Security Studies
 College of Project Management

Rankings
In 2019, Colorado Technical University was ranked 476th out of 500 Masters schools by Washington Monthly. CTU is also ranked tied for 160th on the U.S. News & World Report lists for Best Online Programs. US News currently ranks CTU tied for 90th for online bachelor's programs for veterans.

Accreditation and associations
The university is accredited by the Higher Learning Commission. The Bachelor of Science in Computer Engineering and the Bachelor of Science in Electrical Engineering at the Colorado Springs campus are accredited by the Engineering Accreditation Commission of ABET. The business degree programs offered by Colorado Technical University are ACBSP accredited.

The university is a subsidiary of Perdoceo, formerly Career Education Corporation. The National Security Agency and the Department of Homeland Security recognized CTU as a Center of Academic Excellence in Information Assurance Education.

Student outcomes
According to the National Center for Education Statistics, Colorado Tech's online graduation rate is 23%.

According to the College Scorecard, Colorado Tech has a 25 percent graduation rate. Salary after completing ranged from $24,012 (AA in Health and Medical Administrative Services) to $74,576 (Bachelors in Computer/IT). For student debtors in repayment, 32 percent were in forbearance, 25 percent were not making progress, 18 percent defaulted, 10 percent were in deferment, 7 percent were delinquent, 5 percent were making progress, 2 percent were discharged, and 1 percent were paid in full.

Corporate partnerships
CTU has been an educational provider for McDonald's since 2014.

References

External links
 

Career Education Corporation
Private universities and colleges in Colorado
For-profit universities and colleges in the United States
Technological universities in the United States
Universities and colleges in Denver
Education in Colorado Springs, Colorado
Buildings and structures in Colorado Springs, Colorado
Schools in Pueblo County, Colorado
Educational institutions established in 1965
1965 establishments in Colorado